The FLUGWAG Bremen ESS 641 was a 1970s German glider-towing monoplane designed and built by the Flugwissenschaftliche Arbeitsgemeinschaft Bremen research organisation.

Design and development
The ESS 641 is a low-wing cantilever monoplane  with a fixed tail-wheel landing gear. Powered by a  Avco Lycoming O-360 flat-four piston engine. The pilot had an enclosed cockpit with a transparent canopy.

Specifications

References

Notes

Bibliography

1970s German civil utility aircraft
Glider tugs
Single-engined tractor aircraft
Low-wing aircraft
Aircraft first flown in 1971